Cherry B can refer to:

 Cherry B, a British cherry wine.
 HMS Charybdis (F75), a Leander-class frigate of the Royal Navy nicknamed the "Cherry B".